The Radio Disney Music Awards (RDMA) were an annual awards show operated and governed by Radio Disney, an American radio network. Beginning in 2001, the show was originally broadcast only on Radio Disney, but later began being televised on Disney Channel from 2013 to 2019.

Radio Disney ceased operations on April 14, 2021, after switching to automated programing on January 1 of that same year. The network has made no statement about the future of the awards.

History
The Radio Disney Music Awards honored the year's achievements in music, mainly in the teen pop genre, and were awarded based on popular vote from the network's listeners via online voting. The trophy awarded to a winner is known as the "Golden Mickey", a gold-colored statuette with a silhouette figure of Mickey Mouse donning headphones nicknamed the "Ardy", representing Radio Disney's initials. Before 2014, the ceremony was not televised beyond commercial interstitial segments for Disney Channel to promote their sister radio network. As of the seventh annual ceremony on April 26, 2014, the ceremony began to be televised in full a day after a tape delay, as the network attempted to compete with Nickelodeon's Kids' Choice Awards in airing awards programming. Starting in 2016, Canada was able to vote for the first time as Disney programming, formerly under the control of Family Channel, is now carried by Disney-branded Corus Entertainment networks in both English and French.

On June 16, 2019, the 2019 Radio Disney Music Awards were renamed ARDYs: A Radio Disney Music Celebration and aired live for the first time instead of on a tape-delay.

On June 25, 2020, it was announced that the 2020 Radio Disney Music Awards would be renamed Radio Disney Presents ARDYs Summer Playlist and premiere on July 10, 2020 with Laura Marano as the host.

Awards events

Award categories

Final

Best Female Artist
Best Male Artist
Best Music Group
Song of the Year
Best New Artist
Breakout Artist
Best Crush Song
Song to Dance to
Fiercest Fans
Best Song That Makes You Smile
Best Breakup Song
Best Collaboration
Best Song To Lip Sync To
Country Favorite Artist
Country Favorite Song
Country Best New Artist
Favorite Tour
Favorite Social Media Star
Favorite International Artist

Formerly

Artist with the Best Style
Most Talked About Artist
Best Artist Turned Singer
Best Music Video
Best Soundtrack Song
Catchiest New Song
Best Anthem
Best Album
Best Homework Song
Best Karaoke Song
Best Song to Air Guitar
Best Song to Watch Your Dad Sing
Best Song to Rock Out to with Your BFF
Funniest Celebrity Take
Best Acoustic Performance
Favorite Roadtrip Song

Special awards

Impact Award 
Impact Award is in recognition of an artist's influence on the world of entertainment and society, across generations of music enthusiasts.
2018: Janet Jackson

Hero Award
Hero Award is an honor for contribution for the charitable work.
2014: Shakira
2015: Jennifer Lopez
2016: Gwen Stefani
2017: Nick Jonas
2018: Carrie Underwood
2019: Avril Lavigne

Icon Award
Icon Award is an honor for the music contribution and influence with the teenagers by long-time career artists.
2017: Britney Spears
2018: Kelly Clarkson

Heroes for Change Award
Heroes for Change Award is an honor for young non-artists who make a difference in the world with charitable work.
2013: Mary Dawson, Ben Harowitz, Misha Ahmad, Dara Reyes and Denzell Perry.
2014: Arianna Lopez, Matthew Kaplan and Yossymar Rojas.
2016: Whitney Stewart and Braeden Mannering.

Other special awards
2014: Chart Topper Award to Ariana Grande for her impact on the charts.
2014: Show Stopper Award to R5 for their sold-out shows on Louder Tour.

Achievements
Below are the current rankings for the most wins and most nominated artist among female and male:

Most wins

Most nominations

This is a list of multiple nominated performers and actors with 10 or more career nominations. Hilary Duff is currently the most nominated performer with 35 nominations.

35 nominations
Hilary Duff

22 nominations
Vanessa Hudgens

21 nominations
Avril Lavigne

19 nominations
Ashley Tisdale

17 nominations
Lindsay Lohan

16 nominations
Miley Cyrus
Selena Gomez
Taylor Swift

15 nominations
Zac Efron

14 nominations
Justin Bieber
Kelly Clarkson

11 nominations
R5

10 nominations
Ariana Grande
JoJo

References

External links

 
American music awards
Awards
Disney music
Awards established in 2001
Awards disestablished in 2019
2001 establishments in the United States
2019 disestablishments in the United States